The 51st Fighter Wing (51 FW) is a wing of the United States Air Force and the host unit at Osan Air Base, South Korea. The wing has been based entirely in the Far East during its entire existence, including its combat role as the 51st Fighter-Interceptor Wing during the Korean War.

The 51st Fighter Wing is under Pacific Air Forces' Seventh Air Force. The unit is the most forward deployed wing in the world, providing combat ready forces for close air support, air strike control, counter air, interdiction, theater airlift, and communications in the defense of the Republic of Korea. The wing executes military operations to bed-down, maintain and employ follow-on forces for the combined arms base that includes three major flying tenants and large multi-service fighting units.

The wing is equipped with General Dynamics F-16 Fighting Falcon and Fairchild Republic A-10 Thunderbolt II squadrons and myriad base support agencies conducting the full spectrum of missions providing for the defense of the Republic of Korea.

Mission
The mission of the 51st FW is to provide mission-ready Airmen to execute combat operations and receive follow-on forces. The wing accomplishes this mission through:
 Conducting exercises to ensure our forces maintain the highest degree of readiness to defend Osan AB against air and ground attack.
 Maintaining and administering U.S. operations at Osan and five collocated operating bases—Taegu, Suwon, Kwang Ju, Kimhae and Cheong Ju – for reception and bed-down of follow-on forces.
 Providing timely and accurate air power in support of military operations directed by higher headquarters.

Units
The 51st Fighter Wing is composed of four groups each with specific functions. The Operations Group controls all flying and airfield operations. The Maintenance Group performs maintenance of aircraft, ground equipment and aircraft components. The Mission Support Group has a wide range of responsibilities but a few of its functions are Security, Civil Engineering, Communications, Personnel Management, Logistics, Services and Contracting support, whilst the Medical Group provides medical and dental care.

 51st Operations Group (Tail Code OS)
 51st Operations Support Squadron (OSS)
 25th Fighter Squadron (25 FS) (A-10/OA-10)
 36th Fighter Squadron (36 FS) (Block 40 F-16C/D)
 51st Mission Support Group
 Civil Engineer Squadron (CES)
 Force Support Squadron (FSS)
 Logistics Readiness Squadron (LRS)
 Security Forces Squadron (SFS)
 Communications Squadron (CS)
 51st Maintenance Group
 Aircraft Maintenance Squadron (AMXS)
25th Aircraft Maintenance Unit
36th Aircraft Maintenance Unit
 Maintenance Operations Squadron (MOS)
 Maintenance Squadron (MXS)
 Munitions Squadron (MUNS)

 51st Medical Group
 Aerospace Medicine Squadron (AMDS)
 Medical Support Squadron (MDSS)
 Medical Operations Squadron (MDOS)
 Dental Squadron (DS)
 Bioenvironmental Engineering (BE)

 51st Fighter Wing Staff Agencies
Inspector General (IG)
Comptroller (CPTS)
Entitlements in Korea
Safety (SE)
Chapel (HC)
Legal Office (JA)
Protocol (CCP)
Command Post (CP)
Public Affairs (PA)
Equal Opportunity (EO)
Historian (HO)
Sexual Assault Prevention & Response (SAPR)
Wing Plans (XP)
AFSO21 (CVO)
Information Protection (IP)
Community Support Coordinator (CVB)

History
 For additional history and lineage, see 51st Operations Group
In 1948, assumed air defense of Ryukyu Islands.

Korean War

With the outbreak of the Korean War in 1950, elements of the 51st FIW were dispatched first to Japan, then to South Korea. Korean War operational squadrons were:
 16th Fighter-Interceptor Squadron: duration (F-80C, F-86F)
 25th Fighter-Interceptor Squadron: duration (F-80C, F-8)
 39th Fighter-Interceptor Squadron: attached 1 June 1952– (F-80C, F-86F)
 68th Fighter-All Weather Squadron: attached 25 September – 9 October 1950 (F-82F/G)
 80th Fighter-Bomber Squadron: attached 25 September – 20 December 1950 (F-80C)

It entered combat service flying the F-80C Shooting Star on 22 September of that year, when it moved to Itazuke AB, Japan, to support the breakout of the Eighth U.S. Army from the Pusan Perimeter. For nearly 4 years thereafter, the 51st FIW played a key role in the defense of South Korea despite moving to four different locations within a year and operating under austere conditions.

The wing moved to South Korea in October only to return to Japan in December, leaving combat elements behind. In May 1951, the 51st FIW moved to Suwon Air Base, southwest of Seoul, but retained maintenance and supply elements at Tsuiki AB, Japan, to provide rear echelon support. In November 1951 the 51st FIW transitioned to the F-86 Sabre with two squadrons (16th, 25th), adding a third squadron (26th) the following May.

The group operated a detachment at Suwon AB, Korea, beginning in May 1951, and relocated there in October 1951, with maintenance and supply elements remaining in Japan until August 1954. The wing ceased combat on 27 July 1953. The 51 FIW's war record was impressive. Wing pilots flew more than 45,000 sorties and shot down 312 MiG-15s; this produced 14 air aces including the top ace of the war, Captain Joseph C. McConnell. The ratio of aerial victories to losses was 10 to 1. Unfortunately, the wing lost 32 pilots to enemy action; however, nine that became prisoners of war were repatriated later.

Korean War Aces

Cold War

On 1 August 1954, the 51 FIW returned to Naha Air Base to resume air defense coverage of the Ryukyu Islands. Operational squadrons were:
 16th Fighter-Interceptor Squadron (F-86D, 1954–59), (F102, 1959–1964)
 25th Fighter-Interceptor Squadron (F-86D, 1954–1960)
 26th Fighter-Interceptor Squadron (F-86D, 1954–59)

At the same time, the wing demonstrated its mobility readiness in response to three regional crises.

From August 1958 to January 1959, the 51 FIW deployed eight F-86Ds to Ching Chuan Kang Air Base Taiwan to fly combat air support missions for Nationalist Chinese forces after mainland Communist Chinese forces shelled the Nationalist-held islands of Quemoy and Matsu. Six years later, the wing deployed 12 F-102s to the Philippines and South Vietnam from August to October 1964 for air defense against possible Communist North Vietnamese air attacks.

During the Vietnam War, crews of the 51st Fighter Interceptor Wing provided air defense of Naha AB, Okinawa, with F-102s of the 82nd FIS which was assigned to the 51st FIW from Travis AFB in January 1966. During the 1968 Pueblo crisis, the wing deployed 12 of is 33 aircraft to Suwon AB. On 31 May 1971, the 51st FIW was inactivated, ending almost 17 years of service in the Pacific from Naha when it was inactivated as the Air Force began scaling down its activities in Southeast Asia. In 1975 Naha Air Base closed.

The 51st was inactive for only five months. On 1 November 1971, the wing was redesignated the 51st Air Base Wing and activated at Osan Air Base, South Korea. At Osan, the 51st assumed the host responsibilities of the inactivated 6314th Support Wing to include the Koon-ni range and a variety of remote sites. Operational squadrons of the 51st at Osan have been:

Fighter Squadrons
 25th Fighter Squadron (1992–present A-10, OA-10)
 36th Fighter Squadron (F-4E 1974–88), (F-16C/D 1988–present)
 497th Fighter Squadron (F-4E) (1982–84)

On 1 October 1993, after a half-dozen name changes, the wing returned to its original and current designation as the 51st Fighter Wing. Since then, the 51st has continued operating as a fighter/ground attack wing and continues to be tasked to receive and integrate follow-on reinforcing forces to the peninsula in the event of crisis.

Lineage
 Established as 51 Fighter Wing on 10 August 1948
 Activated on 18 August 1948
 Redesignated 51 Fighter-Interceptor Wing on 1 February 1950
 Inactivated on 31 May 1971
 Redesignated 51 Air Base Wing on 20 October 1971
 Activated on 1 November 1971
 Redesignated: 51 Composite Wing (Tactical) on 30 September 1974
 Redesignated: 51 Tactical Fighter Wing on 1 July 1982
 Redesignated: 51 Wing on 7 February 1992
 Redesignated: 51 Fighter Wing on 1 October 1993.

Assignments
 1st Air Division, 18 August 1948
 Thirteenth Air Force, 1 December 1948
 Twentieth Air Force, 16 May 1949
 Attached to Fifth Air Force, 25 September 1950 – 1 August 1954
 Further attached to 8th Fighter-Bomber Wing, 25 September – 12 October 1950
 313th Air Division, 1 March 1955 – 31 May 1971
 314th Air Division, 1 November 1971
 Seventh Air Force, 8 September 1986–present

Components
Groups
 5th Tactical Air Control (later, 5 Tactical Control; 5 Air Control) Group: 8 January 1980 – 20 June 1982; 1 October 1990 – 1 July 1993
 51st Fighter (later, 51 Fighter-Interceptor, 51 Fighter, 51 Operations) Group: 18 August 1948 – 25 October 1957 (detached 26 September – 12 October 1950, 16 August 1954 – 15 March 1955) ; 1 October 1990–present

Squadrons
 16th Fighter-Interceptor Squadron: attached 1 July – 24 October 1957, assigned 25 October 1957 – 24 December 1964
 19th Tactical Air Support Squadron: 30 September 1974 – 8 January 1980
 25th Fighter-Interceptor (later, 25 Tactical Fighter) Squadron: attached 1 July – 24 October 1957, assigned 25 October 1957 – 8 June 1960; 1 February 1981 – 31 June 1990
 36th Tactical Fighter Squadron: 30 September 1974 – 1 October 1990
 82d Fighter Interceptor Squadron: attached 17 February – 24 June 1966, assigned 25 June 1966 – 31 May 1971 (detached 30 January – 20 February 1968)
 318th Fighter Interceptor Squadron: attached 11–18 February 1968
 497th Tactical Fighter Squadron: 1 January 1982 – 24 January 1989
 555th Tactical Fighter Squadron: attached 11 December 1964 – 15 March 1965 and 11 November 1965 – 25 February 1966
 558th Tactical Fighter Squadron: attached 12 March – 15 June 1965
 559th Tactical Fighter Squadron: attached 12 June – 15 November 1965.

Stations

 Naha Afld (later, Naha AB), Okinawa, 18 August 1948
 Itazuke AB, Japan, 22 September 1950
 Kimpo AB, South Korea, 10 October 1950
 Itazuke AB, Japan, 10 December 1950
 Tsuiki Air Base, Japan, 15 January 1951
 Suwon AB (K-13), South Korea, 1 October 1951 – 26 July 1954
 Naha AB, Okinawa, 1 August 1954 – 31 May 1971
 Osan AB, South Korea, 1 November 1971–present

Aircraft Assigned

The 51st FW's aircrews have flown a variety of aircraft, including the P/F-51 Mustang, F-80 Shooting Star, F-82 Twin Mustang, F-86 Sabrejet, F-94 Starfire, F-102A Delta Dagger, F-4E Phantom II, RF-4C Phantom II, F-106A Delta Dart, OV-10 Bronco, A-10 and OA-10 Thunderbolt II and several versions of the F-16 Fighting Falcon.

Commanders
The list of commanders for the 51st Fighter Wing and its predecessors includes a wartime hero, Colonel Francis Gabreski, and an aviation pioneer, Tuskegee Airman Colonel Benjamin O. Davis Jr. This list includes those who only held command briefly as interim commanders.

Notable members 
 Buzz Aldrin, Served in the 16th Fighter Squadron during the Korean War; attained two aerial victories.
 Lt Col William A. Campbell, Commanded the 25FIS in 1954; served with the Tuskegee Airmen in WWII, flying 106 missions with one aerial victory.
 CMSAF James A. Cody, assigned to the 51st Operations Support Squadron from May 1993 – May 1994; became the 17th Chief Master Sergeant of the Air Force. 
 Gen Benjamin O. Davis, Jr., former commander of the Tuskegee Airmen who became the wing commander and was promoted to General Officer (four-star) post-retirement.
 John Glenn, served as a branch exchange pilot from the USMC to the 25th Fighter Squadron, with three aerial victories in the Korean War.
 Chuck Norris, assigned to Osan security forces where he first started his martial arts practice.
 CMSAF Kaleth O. Wright. assigned to the 51st Dental Squadron from 1994 – 1995 and 2007 – 2009; became the 18th Chief Master Sergeant of the Air Force.

References

 USAAS-USAAC-USAAF-USAF Aircraft Serial Numbers—1908 to present
 This article contains information from the Osan Air Base factsheet which is an official document of the United States Government and is presumed to be in the public domain.

External links
 51 Fighter Wing, AFHRA fact sheet
 Osan AB Home Page
 Video from 1952, describing the day-to-day activities of the Wing.

0051
Military units and formations established in 1948